The Ministry of the Reichswehr() was the defence ministry of the Weimar Republic and the early Third Reich. The 1919 Weimar Constitution provided for a unified, national ministry of defence to coordinate the new Reichswehr, and that ministry was set up in October 1919, from the existing Prussian War Ministry and Reichsmarineamt. It was based in the Bendlerblock building. The Wehrgesetz (Defence Law) of 21 May 1935 renamed it the Reich Ministry of War, which was then abolished in 1938 and replaced with the Oberkommando der Wehrmacht.

History
Within the framework of the Gesetz über die Bildung einer vorläufigen Reichswehr ("Law on the formation of a provisional national defence force") of March 1919, the Reichspräsident was commander-in-chief of the armed forces, with the Reichswehrminister (Reich Minister of Defence) exercising command. These arrangements left out the Prussian armed forces, which remained under the command of the Prussian Minister of War. After the Weimar Constitution came into force, the war ministries of Bavaria, Saxony, Württemberg and Prussia were dissolved and command authority was concentrated in the hand of the national Reichswehrminister. Power of command for each branch was given to the head of the Army Command (Heeresleitung) and the head of the Navy Command (Marineleitung). The Ministeramt was established as a third office within the ministry in 1929, with the Ministeramt′s head acting as the Reichswehrminister′s political deputy. The innocuous Troop Office (Truppenamt) functioned as a covert general staff, which was banned by the Treaty of Versailles.

The "Verkündung der Wehrhoheit" (proclamation of military sovereignty) of 1935 created a new Oberkommando der Luftwaffe (OKL), under the Air Ministry, and turned the Heeresleitung into the Oberkommando des Heeres (OKH) and the Marineleitung into the Oberkommando der Marine (OKM). The Ministeramt was renamed the Wehrmachtsamt. As a result of the Blomberg-Fritsch Affair in 1938, the Reichskriegsminister and Wehrmachtsamt were abolished by Adolf Hitler and their duties transferred to the Oberkommando der Wehrmacht (OKW).

Lists of officials

Defence Ministers

Minister of Defence

Minister of War

Ministerial office heads
Heads of the Ministeramt (Chefs des Ministeramtes)

Heads of the Wehrmachtamt (Chefs des Wehrmachtamtes)

Army heads
Heads of the Army Command (Chefs der Heeresleitung)

Commander-in-chief of the Army (Oberbefehlshaber des Heeres)

Navy heads
Chief of the Admiralty (Chef der Admiralität)

Heads of the Naval Command (Chefs der Marineleitung)

Commander-in-chief of the Navy (Oberbefehlshaber der Kriegsmarine)

References

External links
 Article on adlexikon.de

Germany
Reichswehr
Reichswehr
Ministers of the Reichswehr